The 1955 Nobel Prize in Literature was awarded to the Icelandic writer Halldór Kiljan Laxness (1902–1998) "for his vivid epic power which has renewed the great narrative art of Iceland." He is the first and only Icelandic recipient of the Nobel prize in all categories. The literary critic Sveinn Hoskuldsson described him, saying: "His chief literary works belong to the genre... [of] narrative prose fiction. In the history of our literature Laxness is mentioned beside Snorri Sturluson, the author of "Njals saga", and his place in world literature is among writers such as Cervantes, Zola, Tolstoy, and Hamsun... He is the most prolific and skillful essayist in Icelandic literature both old and new..."

Laureate

Halldór Laxness wrote novels, poetry, journalism, essays and plays. He is best known for three series of books that are set in Iceland and in some way incorporate social realism and were written in the 1930s. Salka Valka: A Novel of Iceland (1931–1922) describes life in an Icelandic fishing village; Sjálfstaett fólk: Hetjusaga ("Independent People: An Epic", 1934–35) is a four-part series based on the life of poet Magnus Hjaltason Magnusson; and Heimsljós ("World Light", 1937–1940) is a four-part series. The conventional Icelandic saga influenced Laxness' later works. His other famous works include Vefarinn mikli frá Kasmír ("The Great Weaver from Kashmir", 1927), Atómstöðin ("The Atom Station", 1948), and Brekkukotsannáll ("The Fish Can Sing", 1957).

Deliberations

Nominations
In total, the Nobel Committee received 59 nominations for 46 individuals. 17 of the nominees were newly nominated including Ezra Pound, Edith Sitwell, Adriaan Roland Holst, William Somerset Maugham, Eugenio Montale (awarded in 1975), Henri Bosco, Ernst Robert Curtius, Giorgos Seferis (awarded in 1963), Saint-John Perse (awarded in 1960), Carlos Vaz Ferreira, and Giovanni Papini. Three of the nominees were women namely the British critic Edith Sitwell, the Estonian poet Marie Under, and the Danish author Karen Blixen.

The authors James Agee, Ruby Mildred Ayres, Gilbert Cannan, Dale Carnegie, Beatrice Chase, Robert P. Tristram Coffin, Lawrence Pearsall Jacks, Joseph Jefferson Farjeon, Constance Holme, Hong Shen, Mariano Latorre, Roger Mais, Saadat Hasan Manto, Adrienne Monnier, Robert Riskin, Robert E. Sherwood, Alexandru Teodor Stamatiad, Wallace Stevens, Pierre Teilhard de Chardin, and Augustin Josip Ujević died in 1955 without having been nominated for the prize.

Prize decision
Laxness had been a candidate for the prize since 1948. In 1955 he was shortlisted along with Juan Ramón Jiménez (awarded in 1956) and Ramón Menéndez Pidal. A shared prize between Laxness and his countryman Gunnar Gunnarsson was proposed but rejected by the Nobel committee.

The members of the Swedish Academy were divided in support of the final three candidates. Three rounds of voting were required to decide the laureate. On the first voting Jiménez received the highest number of votes, but not the required majority of the votes. On the third voting Laxness received a majority of the votes, 10 votes, and could be declared the winner of the 1955 Nobel Prize in Literature.

Award Ceremony
In the presentation address for the Nobel prize Elias Wessén stated:"He is an excellent painter of Icelandic scenery and settings. Yet this is not what he has conceived of as his chief mission. 'Compassion is the source of the highest poetry. Compassion with Asta Sollilja on earth,' he says in one of his best books… And a social passion underlies everything Halldór Laxness has written. His personal championship of contemporary social and political questions is always very strong, sometimes so strong that it threatens to hamper the artistic side of his work. His safeguard then is the astringent humour which enables him to see even people he dislikes in a redeeming light, and which also permits him to gaze far down into the labyrinths of the human soul."

References

External links
Award Ceremony speech nobelprize.org
The Nobel Prize Award Ceremony 1955 nobelprize.org

1955
Halldór Laxness